The 2020 Arkansas State Red Wolves football team represented Arkansas State University in the 2020 NCAA Division I FBS football season. The Red Wolves played their home games at Centennial Bank Stadium in Jonesboro, Arkansas, and competed in the West Division of the Sun Belt Conference. They were led by Blake Anderson, in his seventh season as head coach. Butch Jones was hired to replace Anderson, after the team played to a 4–7 record (2–6 in conference play).

Schedule
Arkansas State had games scheduled against Howard and Michigan, which were canceled due to the COVID-19 pandemic.

Schedule Source:

Game summaries

at Memphis

at Kansas State

at Coastal Carolina

Central Arkansas

Georgia State

at Appalachian State

Troy

at Louisiana

at Texas State

South Alabama

Rankings

References

Arkansas State
Arkansas State Red Wolves football seasons
Arkansas State Red Wolves football